Michael Padilla (born 1948/1949) is an American politician who is the mayor of Topeka, Kansas, serving since January 2022. Prior to becoming mayor, Padilla was a member of the Topeka Police Department for 33 years and served one term on Topeka's city council.

Career
Padilla is a second-generation Mexican American. He graduated from Hayden High School and Washburn University. He worked for Adams Business Forms but left the job in 1970 to become a police officer for Topeka's police department.

In 2000, Padilla, then a police captain, ran for sheriff of Shawnee County as a Democrat. He won the Democratic Party's primary election in August, but lost the November general election to the incumbent, Republican Richard Barta. Padilla retired from the Topeka Police Department in 2003 at the rank of major.

Padilla was elected to Topeka's city council to represent District 5 in 2017. In January 2021, the members of the Topeka City Council elected Padilla as deputy mayor. After mayor Michelle De La Isla decided not to run for reelection in 2021, Padilla announced his candidacy for mayor. Padilla defeated Leo Cangiani in the non-partisan election with 60.9% of the vote (9,209 to 5,862) on November 2. He was sworn in as mayor on January 4, 2022.

References

American police officers
American politicians of Mexican descent
Hispanic and Latino American city council members
Hispanic and Latino American mayors
Kansas city council members
Kansas Democrats
Living people
Mayors of Topeka, Kansas
Washburn University alumni
Year of birth missing (living people)